Bikács is a small village in Tolna (county) in Hungary.  Its population is approximately 500.

References

Populated places in Tolna County